Elastic Days is the third solo studio album by Dinosaur Jr. frontman J Mascis. It was released through Sub Pop Records on November 9, 2018.

Release
On August 21, 2018, Mascis announced the release of his new album, along with the first single "See You at the Movies". The second single "Everything She Said" was released on September 18, 2018. The third single "Web So Dense" was released on October 16, 2018.

Production
The album was recorded at Mascis' Bisquiteen Studio in Amherst, Massachusetts, and features vocal contributions by Pall Jenkins, Mark Mulcahy and Zoë Randell.

Tour
In support of the album, Mascis went on a North American tour, starting on November 7, 2018 in Vancouver, British Columbia and finished on December 15, 2018 in Portland, Maine.

Critical reception

Elastic Days was met with "generally favorable" reviews from critics. At Metacritic, which assigns a weighted average rating out of 100 to reviews from mainstream publications, this release received an average score of 75, based on 17 reviews. Aggregator Album of the Year gave the release a 75 out of 100 based on a critical consensus of 21 reviews.

Mark Deming from AllMusic explained that Mascis' vocals on the album sound "more lucid, better focused and more conscious of what he has to say; the performances have a depth of feeling he doesn't always reveal in Dinosaur Jr.."

Track listing

Personnel

Musicians
 J Mascis – vocals, guitar, drums
 Ken Maiuri – piano on tracks 1 to 5, 7, 8, 10
 Mark Mulcahy – guest vocals
 Zoë Randell – guest vocals
 Pete Snake – guest vocals
 Pall Jenkins – guest vocals

Production
 John Agnello – mixer
 Steve Hassett – engineer
 Greg Calbi – mastering

Charts

References

2018 albums
J Mascis albums
Sub Pop albums